The Timeless Collection Vol. 1 is the first English cover album by J-Pop artist K. Each of his seven singles released so far contained a cover of an English, and now those songs are compiled into this album along with other songs. Also included on this album are the songs "True Colors", Sony Ericsson commercial theme, and "Honesty", a song featured on the tribute album "Wanna Be the Piano Man." The album also features two live tracks and is released in CD+DVD and CD-only versions. The DVD includes clips of live performances.

Track listing

CD

DVD
 Back Stage
 Just Once
 Interview #01
 I Like It
 Honesty
 Interview #02
 Just the Two of Us
 Back Stage
 One Last Cry
 Back Stage

References
 http://www.k-official.com/

2007 albums
K (singer) albums
Covers albums